is a public junior college in Ōtsuki, Yamanashi, Japan. It was founded in 1955.

Departments
 Department of economics

See also
 List of junior colleges in Japan

External links

 

Japanese junior colleges
Universities and colleges in Yamanashi Prefecture
Educational institutions established in 1955
1955 establishments in Japan
Ōtsuki, Yamanashi